This is a list of members of the Council of the German Cultural Community between 1990 and 1995, following the direct elections of 1990.

Composition

Sources
 

List
1990s in Belgium